Sukkampalayam is a village in Palladam Taluk in Tiruppur District in the Indian state Tamil Nadu. Sukkampalayam is located 35 km far from Coimbatore City, 6.7 km distance from its Taluk Main Town Palladam . Sukkampalayam is 24 km far from Tirupur. Palladam HiTech Weaving Park(PHWP) is located on the outskirts of Sukkampalayam.

Demographics
 India census, Sukkampalayam had a population of 4420. Males constitute 50.63% (2238) of the population and females 49.37% (2182).

 India census, Sukkampalayam had a population of 3395. Males constitute 50.5% of the population and females 49.5%.

Adjacent communities

Villages
 Semmipalayam(.4 km)
 Kodangipalayam(2.7 km)
 Paruvai(5.7 km)
 Karadivavi(6.5 km)
 Poomalur(7.8 km)

Towns
 Palladam(6.7 km)
 Uttukkuli(16.8 km)
 Tirupur(18.2 km)
 Avanashi(20.4 km)

References

Cities and towns in Tiruppur district